Pristina is the capital and largest city of Kosovo.

Pristina may also refer to:
 District of Pristina, Kosovo
 FC Prishtina, a football club of Pristina
 Pristina Municipality, Kosovo
 Pristina International Airport Adem Jashari, an international airport in Kosovo
 Pristina (annelid), a genus of annelids in the family Naididae

See also
 University of Pristina (disambiguation)
 Hasan Prishtina (1873–1933), Albanian politician and activist